Sainte-Colombe is a commune in the Charente-Maritime department in the Nouvelle-Aquitaine region in southwestern France.

Geography
The Seugne forms most of the commune's southwestern border.

Population

See also
Communes of the Charente-Maritime department

References

Communes of Charente-Maritime
Charente-Maritime communes articles needing translation from French Wikipedia